is a former Japanese football player.

Playing career
Takagi was born in Yasu on 21 November 1980. After dropped out from Kyoto Sangyo University, he joined J1 League club Shimizu S-Pulse in June 2000. However he could hardly play in the match until 2002. In 2003, he played many matches as left side back until summer. However he could not play many matches from summer 2003. In August 2004, he moved to Vissel Kobe on loan. He became a regular player as center back of three backs defense. In 2005, he returned to Shimizu S-Pulse. He became a regular player as defensive midfielder and played with Teruyoshi Ito for the position. From summer 2005, he became a regular player as center back. He played with mainly Toshihide Saito or Ryuzo Morioka for the position and the club won the 2nd place Emperor's Cup. From 2006, he played as center back with Naoaki Aoyama for 3 seasons and the club won the 2nd place 2008 J.League Cup. In 2009, he moved to Gamba Osaka. In 2009, although he could not play many matches in league competition, he played many matches in Emperor's Cup and won the champions. In 2010, he became a regular player and played many matches as center back with Sota Nakazawa. The club also won the 2nd place in J1 League. However his opportunity to play decreased behind Satoshi Yamaguchi in 2011. In 2012, he moved to Vissel Kobe again. However he could not play many matches and the club was relegated to J2 League end of 2012 season. In 2013, he moved to Oita Trinita. Although he played many matches as center back of three backs defense, the club was relegated to J2 from 2014. In 2014, he became a captain and played many matches as regular center back. In 2015, he moved to J2 club FC Gifu and played many matches as center back. In 2016, he moved to J1 club Júbilo Iwata. However he could hardly play in the match. In 2017, he moved to Thailand and joined Air Force Central. In 2018, he returned to Japan and joined his locals club MIO Biwako Shiga in Japan Football League. He retired end of 2018 season.

National team career
On 20 August 2008, he debuted for Japan national team against Uruguay. He played 5 games for Japan until 2009.

Club statistics

National team statistics

Appearances in major competitions

Honours and awards
 Emperor's Cup - 2001, 2009

References

External links
 
Japan National Football Team Database
 
 

1980 births
Living people
Kyoto Sangyo University alumni
Association football people from Shiga Prefecture
Japanese footballers
Japan international footballers
J1 League players
J2 League players
Japan Football League players
Shimizu S-Pulse players
Vissel Kobe players
Gamba Osaka players
Oita Trinita players
FC Gifu players
Júbilo Iwata players
MIO Biwako Shiga players
Association football defenders